Todd Anthony Bridges (born January 6, 1965) is an American actor. He portrayed Willis Jackson on the sitcom Diff'rent Strokes and had a recurring role as Monk on the sitcom Everybody Hates Chris. Bridges worked as a commentator on the television series TruTV Presents: World's Dumbest... from 2008 to 2013.

Early life
Bridges was born on January 6, 1965, in San Francisco, California, the son of Betty Alice Pryor, an actress, director and manager, and James Bridges Sr., a talent agent. His brother Jimmy Bridges, sister Verda Bridges, and niece Brooke Bridges are also actors.

Career

Television

Bridges appeared on The Waltons, Little House on the Prairie and the landmark miniseries Roots. He was a regular on the Barney Miller spinoff Fish. It was playing Willis Jackson on the long-running NBC sitcom Diff'rent Strokes that made him a household name, along with those of fellow co-stars Conrad Bain, Charlotte Rae, Dana Plato and Gary Coleman. With Rae's death in 2018, Bridges became the last surviving original cast member. (Two actors who joined the regular cast later are still living : Mary Jo Catlett and Danny Cooksey.)

Bridges appeared in the 2002 special Celebrity Boxing with friend Vanilla Ice, whom he defeated. In 2006, Bridges appeared as a contestant on a celebrity episode of Fear Factor but was eliminated after the first stunt. Also in 2006, he appeared as a contestant on the Fox reality show Skating with Celebrities but was eliminated in the second episode of the show because he was using roller skates instead of ice skates. In January 2007, he appeared as a member of the "mob" on the American version of the game show 1 vs. 100. He and his wife Dori Bridges appeared in the November 14, 2007 episode of the MyNetworkTV show Decision House titled "Burned Bridges." He also had a recurring role on the UPN/The CW sitcom Everybody Hates Chris.

In March 2008, Bridges appeared on TruTV Presents: World's Dumbest..., on which he continues to appear as a frequent commentator. That October, he debuted as a contestant on Hulk Hogan's Celebrity Championship Wrestling on CMT as a member of Team Beefcake (coached by former wrestler Brutus "The Barber" Beefcake). Bridges' wrestling persona was the character Mr. Not So Perfect. In one episode, he defeated Tonya Harding with a lead pipe. The judges praised him for his athleticism and his cunning while defeating Harding. After reaching the finals along with Butterbean and Dustin Diamond, Bridges was defeated by Dennis Rodman. In 2015, Bridges was the host of a live game show titled Lovers or Losers: The Game Show at the Plaza Hotel & Casino in Las Vegas. In 2022, Bridges was announced as a HouseGuest competing in the third season of Celebrity Big Brother.

Music videos
Bridges has appeared in several music videos. His first appearance was in Penny Ford's single "Change Your Wicked Ways" (1984). He made a cameo in Moby's 2002 music video for "We Are All Made of Stars" and in the video for the Black Keys' 2011 single "Howlin' for You."

Personal life
Bridges' son Spencir Bridges (born July 15, 1998) from his marriage to former wife Dori Bridges (née Smith) is also a former child actor who appeared in the film Daddy Day Camp and an episode of iCarly. Bridges also has a daughter from a previous relationship.

In 1998, Bridges and his brother James saved the life of Stella Kline, a 51-year-old paraplegic woman who nearly drowned when her wheelchair rolled into a lake while she was fishing. Kline said: "I was thanking God that he was there and you know, everybody's been saying nothing but bad stuff about Todd Bridges on the news and in the papers... He has a heart of gold." Bridges remarked: "We felt God put us there at the right time to save this lady's life, because there was no one else around."

In a 2010 appearance on The Oprah Winfrey Show, Bridges said that he was sexually abused at age 11 by a publicist who was also a family friend.

On September 25, 2022, he married designer Bettijo Hirschi.

Legal and criminal problems
Bridges started smoking marijuana as a 15-year-old star on Diff'rent Strokes. In his twenties, Bridges battled a crack cocaine and methamphetamine addiction. He bought and sold drugs to support his addiction. Bridges was arrested for felony assault and cocaine possession.

In 1983, Bridges was fined $240 for carrying a concealed firearm. In 1987, he received a suspended sentence after pleading no contest when charged with making a bomb threat.

In 1989, Bridges was arrested and tried for the attempted murder of Kenneth "Tex" Clay, a Los Angeles-area drug dealer whom prosecutors argued had been shot by Bridges. Bridges pleaded not guilty and was represented by the famous defense attorney Johnnie Cochran, who argued that Bridges was an abused minor who had been driven to drugs by an exploitative entertainment industry and was now being framed. A witness finally testified that Bridges was not at the shooting, and Bridges was acquitted of all charges by a jury.

Bridges was arrested on December 29, 1992 on suspicion of transporting narcotics for sale and possession of a loaded firearm after Burbank, California police officers discovered methamphetamines and a loaded gun in his car. He was released on $10,000 bail. Bridges stopped using drugs on February 24, 1993 after years of use.

Memoir 
Bridges wrote a book, Killing Willis: From Diff'rent Strokes to the Mean Streets to the Life I Always Wanted (2008), discussing his childhood sexual abuse, drug addiction, criminal charges and efforts to establish a public identity independent of the Willis character. He appeared on The Oprah Winfrey Show on April 28, 2010 to discuss the troubled past that he had chronicled in his memoir.

Filmography

Film

Television

Video games

References

External links
 
 

1965 births
Living people
20th-century American male actors
21st-century American male actors
African-American male actors
African-American male child actors
American male child actors
American male comedians
American male film actors
American male television actors
Male actors from California
Male actors from San Francisco
Male actors from the San Francisco Bay Area
People from the San Francisco Bay Area